Saguache (suh-WATCH ) is a Statutory Town in and the county seat of Saguache County, Colorado, United States.  The population was 493 at the U.S. Census 2010.

History
Saguache is a small historical village in an agricultural area in southern Colorado at the northern gateway to the San Luis Valley, a  valley between the Sangre de Cristo Range on the east and the San Juan Mountains to the west. Saguache Creek flows through the town from its beginnings high in the San Juan mountains. The site has been known for centuries to Native Americans who moved down from their summer homes in the mountains to the valley during the winter months. The Spanish began to move into the area in the 1600s and Spanish sheepherders passed through each year as they drove their flocks into the hills for summer grazing. Later the early  white settlers and miners passed through this area, many seeking passage west along the Old Spanish Trail.  In the mid-1860s, the first permanent white settlements were established in Saguache and the nearby town of Villa Grove. Saguache County was officially founded in 1866.

The formation of the town was influenced by the occupations and needs of the era. Beginning as a trading post, in the late 1800s mining became a significant influence as the Colorado mining boom brought hundreds of mining operations to the surrounding mountains and the miners needed a steady supply of food and other goods.

The town was founded by Otto Mears, who came to Saguache in 1867.  Mears constructed a wheat thresher and a grist mill for thrashing and grinding wheat to make flour to supply Saguache and the surrounding mines. He also built toll roads over the nearby mountain passes to use for hauling supplies to mining camps to the north, and to further open the area to settlement. The Saguache Town Company was formed in 1874 turning Saguache into a booming supply town. Mears also established a newspaper, the Saguache Chronicle, to attract pioneers to Saguache. Mears later helped build the Million Dollar Highway.

Today

From its early days as a boom town, the population of Saguache has shrunk to around 500 residents. The Saguache visitor guide writes that "In its heyday, Saguache could boast of having the Colorado Hall (serving the purest wines and liquors), the Saguache Meat Market, a boarding house, a grocery, law firms, a hardware store, a hotel, a sawmill, and The Saguache Chronicle newspaper."  After several name changes, The Saguache Chronicle eventually became The Saguache Crescent. The paper is printed every week on a flatbed press built in 1915 with metal type cast on a Linotype composing machine. The Linotype may be the only one still in use in the United States. It is also still the county's "paper of record," and is operated by a third generation descendant of the family who purchased it in 1917.

The early sheep ranching eventually gave way to cattle and alfalfa hay production. Present-day Saguache has "one school, a library, a museum, four churches, two gas stations, one liquor store, two grocery stores, two restaurants, a sawmill, and an organic farm."

Name
According to a 2013 Denver Post article entitled, "What's in a Colorado name pronunciation?", the name Saguache (pronounced ) comes from a Ute language word meaning "sand dune". A Native American, Naranjo, explains the history of the name: "The Utes don't have an alphabet. The way the immigrants heard it, the way you hear it, is how they spelled it.  The word is 'sə wŭp;' it means 'sand dunes.' But the immigrants couldn't pronounce it, so they called it 'sə wäch.' "

But according to a  1995 letter to the editor of the Colorado Central Magazine, the name Saguache means "Blue earth — water at the blue earth."  The writer had written to correct an article in which the word was said to mean "green place", but according to the writer, the word comes from a shortened form of the Ute language word "Saguaguachipa."  The Ute tribe encampments were common in the area around the present-day community and the name "referred to springs in which blue earth was said to be found to the north".  The Editors replied:  "The Ute Dictionary, published in 1977 by the Southern Ute Indian Tribe of Ignacio, Colo., defines "sagwa-ci" [diacritical marks omitted] as "'Saguache', lit. 'green place'; name of a town in the San Luis Valley in So. Colorado ..." One source states that the "blue earth" mentioned refers to a deposit of blue clay found near the creek.

The Colorado State Historical Society has a different take on the meaning: The note on a community monument: Saguache, "the name derived from the Indian word `Blue Water'."

The Spanish language version of this name is usually spelled "Saguache", while the English language version is usually spelled "Sawatch".

Geography
Saguache is served by U.S. Route 285 and Colorado State Highway 114. Saguache Creek flows past to the southwest of the community.

Demographics

As of the census of 2000, there were 578 people, 262 households, and 160 families residing in the town. The racial makeup of the town was 79.93% White, 2.60% Native American, 0.17% Asian, 13.15% from other races, and 4.15% from two or more races. Hispanic or Latino of any race were 34.43% of the population.

There were 262 households, out of which 26.0% had children under the age of 18 living with them, 45.4% were married couples living together, 12.2% had a female householder with no husband present, and 38.9% were non-families. 33.6% of all households were made up of individuals, and 17.2% had someone living alone who was 65 years of age or older.  The average household size was 2.14 and the average family size was 2.73.

In the town, the population was spread out, with 23.0% under the age of 18, 5.2% from 18 to 24, 25.8% from 25 to 44, 28.5% from 45 to 64, and 17.5% who were 65 years of age or older.  The median age was 41 years. For every 100 females, there were 99.3 males.  For every 100 females age 18 and over, there were 91.0 males.

The median income for a household in the town was $21,544, and the median income for a family was $30,221. Males had a median income of $24,306 versus $17,917 for females. The per capita income for the town was $14,139.  About 13.7% of families and 18.7% of the population were below the poverty line, including 23.6% of those under age 18 and 16.5% of those age 65 or over.

Attractions and recreation

As the gateway to the San Juan Mountains, home to the Rio Grande National Forest and the La Garita Wilderness Area, Saguache offers outdoor activities such as sightseeing, cycling, hiking and camping.   Highway 114 to Cochetopa Pass follows the original Old Spanish Trail, offering high country scenery and access to large tracts of public lands.

Saguache has a small museum.  According to the information they provide:
In a tribute to our forebears and in keeping with the work ethic embedded from our agricultural heritage, this Museum has won acclaim from visitors all over the United States, and many foreign countries.A Tour of the Saguache County Museum

The museum provides information related to convicted cannibal Alferd Packer, who served time in the Saguache County Jail.  On February 9, 1874, Alferd Packer and five other men departed from the camp of Ute Chief Ouray, near what is now Montrose, Colorado, prospecting for gold.  The party was soon stranded in a blizzard near Lake City and nothing was seen of them until April, when Packer came out of the mountains alone.  Packer gave several conflicting stories about the fate of the other men, but finding his stories dubious he was jailed in Saguache where he remained until August, when he escaped.  By coincidence, on the day of Packer's escape from the Saguache jail, the remains of the missing prospectors were found with evidence of foul play and cannibalism.  He was eventually found in Wyoming; he was returned and tried in Lake City.  Found guilty, he was sentenced to 40 years and was paroled after serving 17.  He died in 1907 and by all accounts had been "a model citizen" for his remaining years.

Due to the nature of the crime, at the time it was sensationalized and well-covered throughout the nation, and it remains a well-known incident locally in Colorado.   The area where the bodies were discovered is now known as Cannibal Plateau.
Packer is remembered in Lake City by holding an annual Alferd Packer Jeep Tour and Barbecue. The cafeteria in the University of Colorado, Boulder, student union is called the Alferd Packer Memorial Grill.

The museum displays a figure of Packer sitting in a cell with the sheriff guarding the prisoner from his chair in his office.  On display are handcuffs, leg irons and other items relating to the history of Alferd Packer.

See also

 List of municipalities in Colorado
 Old Spanish National Historic Trail
 San Luis Valley

References

External links

 Saguache airport

Towns in Saguache County, Colorado
Towns in Colorado
Colorado placenames of Native American origin
County seats in Colorado